Martins Ferry High School is a public high school in Martins Ferry, Ohio, United States.  It is the only high school in the Martins Ferry City School District.  Athletic teams compete as the Martins Ferry Purple Riders in the Ohio High School Athletic Association as a member of the Buckeye 8 Athletic League as well as the Ohio Valley Athletic Conference.

The Martins Ferry City School District has median household income of $23,960, thus making the school eligible for a Title I program, including access to state and federal assistance to help low-income and at risk students. The head school administrator, Joe Mamone, oversees the school's staff, including thirty full-time "equivalent" teachers serving the student body with an average class size of 17.8. The majority of students enrolled are White, making up about eighty-three percent of all students.

Athletics

Ohio High School Athletic Association State Championships
 Boys Baseball – 1930 
 Boys Basketball – 1941

Buckeye 8 Championships
Girls Track - 2012, 2013, 2014, 2015, 2016

Notable alumni
 Jim Brown - former Ohio State Buckeyes golf coach, longest-tenured coach in university history (1972-2009)
 Lou Groza - former Cleveland Browns kicker and offensive tackle, member of Pro Football Hall of Fame
 Alex Groza - former basketball player who was banned from NBA for life in 1951 for point shaving
 James A. Wright - Pulitzer Prize-winning poet

References

External links
 District Website

High schools in Belmont County, Ohio
Public high schools in Ohio